Nsirimo (Nsuda-Imo: "falling Imo river") is a large community of about 5,000 people situated in Ubakala, Umuahia South Local Government in Abia state, Nigeria. It comprises autonomous community (Umuako, Umumba, Umuezu and Umuerim).Umumba is a community consisting of the Ibeku tribe and some other smaller tribes. It is bordered with Umuako in the west and Ubakala in the south. Its major market is Oreama market which is in the north. Umumba is not to far from Apumiri the Headquarters of  Umuahia South Local Government Area.

History
It was originally made up of 5 kindred groups which gave it its other name "Nsirimo Ama-ise". Those 5 kindred groups are: Umuako, Umumba, Umuezu, Umuaha and Umuerim. However, these groups have grown large over time and have been integrated to form three larger communities, each with a traditional ruler (Eze) the paramount ruler. The three communities are:

 Nsirimo Autonomous Community (Umuako and Umuaha) whose traditional ruler is Eze Moses I.Akpaka (Imo I of Nsirimo).
 Umumba Autonomous Community, Nsirimo (Umumba), whose traditional ruler is Eze Godwill O.Ogbonna (Mba I of Umumba).
 Ezu-na-Erim Autonomous Community, Nsirimo (Umuezu and Umuerim), whose traditional ruler was Eze Sir J.A.I.E.Okwuonu (Erizuo I of Ezunaerim) who was later scheduled to be succeeded by Eze Prof. Victor Chikezie Uchendu but was unable to take place as he was killed by hoodlums(of which two were members of his extended family.

Geography
Nsirimo is bounded by the Imo River (which is where its name is actually derived), Mbaise beyond the Imo River, Obioma-Ngwa and other suburbs of Umuahia South LGA like Umuwanwa Autonomous Communities; Amuzu, and Abam, its two sister Autonomous Communities all in Ubakala Clan.

Economy
Nsirimo has no big market except the orie-ama which is a daily market. There are smaller markets in Mbaraekpe (evening) and one in Umuerim. The other markets the people attend are in neighboring towns: Ahia-orie Ntigha, Orieukwu Amorji, among others. Some of the people are traders of assorted articles; butchers who trade on cows and goats; palm produce buyers. There are farmers, mainly subsistence level, in a variety of crops but cassava based, yams, cocoyams and three-leaved yams. Some fish are caught from the Imo River and streams. The economy receives a boost from palm by-products: oil, kernels, mats and rafia-palm which give local palm wine which the people enjoy.

Festivals
In Nsirimo there is usually a yearly celebration of the New Yam festival around August/September and the Ikoro Dance which takes place from mid-December to early January. The Ikoro Dance involves masquerades displays from various Communities in Nsirimo, it is fast losing its popularity as the influence of Christianity is getting stronger. There are other cultural dance groups as the "Obi Buruotu Women Dance Group"; the Ajambele Youth Dance Group; the Edere Cultural Dance Group; the Ekpe Cultural; and other women cultural dances.

Eze Moses I Akpaka (Imo 1 of Nsirimo) died in August 2016 and was buried on 28 October 2016.

References

Populated places in Abia State
Villages in Igboland